The term pitch moth refers to certain small moths whose caterpillars feed on pines. The feeding action causes the pine tree to shed its resin, which forms pitch-like masses on and under the tree. There are several species of "pitch moths" and not all are closely related:


In the clearwing moth family (Sesiidae)
 Synanthedon pini  (pitch mass borer)
 Synanthedon sequoiae  (sequoia pitch moth)

In the snout moth family (Pyralidae)
 Dioryctria amatella (southern pine coneworm)

See also
 Dendroctonus (turpentine beetles) which cause similar symptoms

Animal common name disambiguation pages
Moths